Baladeh Rural District is a rural district (dehestan) in Khorramabad District, Tonekabon County, Mazandaran Province, Iran. At the 2006 census, its population was 25,099, in 6,907 families. The rural district has 67 villages.

References 

Rural Districts of Mazandaran Province
Tonekabon County